Georg August Rudolph (25 September 1816 in Kassel – 13 December 1893 in Marburg) was a German politician and from 4 December 1856 until 2 August 1884 mayor of Marburg.

References 

1816 births
1893 deaths
Politicians from Kassel
University of Marburg alumni
Mayors of Marburg